Zvoriștea is a commune located in Suceava County, Western Moldavia, northeastern Romania. It is composed of eight villages, namely: Buda, Dealu, Poiana, Slobozia, Stânca, Stâncuța, Șerbănești, and Zvoriștea.

Natives 

 Dan Lupașcu
 Elena Murariu

External links 

 Historical documents about Zvoriștea

References 

Communes in Suceava County
Localities in Western Moldavia